Peter McIntyre (11 November 1875 – 1938) was a Scottish footballer who played in the Football League for Preston North End and Sheffield United.

References

1875 births
1938 deaths
Scottish footballers
English Football League players
Scottish Football League players
Association football central defenders
Footballers from East Ayrshire
Glenbuck Cherrypickers F.C. players
Preston North End F.C. players
Rangers F.C. players
Abercorn F.C. players
Wigan County F.C. players
Sheffield United F.C. players
Hamilton Academical F.C. players
Portsmouth F.C. players